The Kid from Arizona is a 1931 American pre-Code Western film directed by Robert J. Horner and starring Jack Perrin, Josephine Hill and Robert D. Walker.

Cast
 Jack Perrin as Marshal Jack 
 Josephine Hill as Ranch Owner's Daughter 
 Robert D. Walker as The Crooked Foreman / Gang Leader 
 Henry Roquemore as The Colonel, Ranch Owner 
 George Chesebro as Henchman 
 Ben Corbett as Henchman

Plot
A marshal is falsely accused of stealing horses while he is trying to corral a group of renegade Indians. The true culprits turn out to be white men disguised as Indians.

References

Bibliography
 Michael R. Pitts. Poverty Row Studios, 1929–1940: An Illustrated History of 55 Independent Film Companies, with a Filmography for Each. McFarland & Company, 2005.

External links
 

1931 films
1931 Western (genre) films
American Western (genre) films
Films directed by Robert J. Horner
1930s English-language films
1930s American films